Sleep Well is a studio album by American electronic music group Electric President. Released in 2008 on the Morr Music label, it is a follow-up to the group's 2006 debut album, S/T.

Track listing

References

External links
 

2008 albums
Morr Music albums
Electric President albums